Pankaj Jha is an Indian actor and painter, based out of Mumbai, India. His filmography includes Black Friday, Gulaal, Chameli, Anwar and Matrubhoomi. He has also acted in the television serial, Kashi.

Filmography 
 Nirmal Pathak Ki Ghar Wapsi(2022) as Makhanlal Pathak
 Panchayat (2022) as MLA Chandra Kishore Singh
 Setters (2019)
 Baankey Ki Crazy Baraat (2015)
 Teen Patti (2010)  
 Gulaal (2009) - Jadhwal  
 Black Friday (2007) - Anwar Theba  
 Anwar (2007) - Pandey 
 Haasil (2003) - Naate  
 Matrubhoomi (2003) - Rakesh  
 Hazaaron Khwaishein Aisi (2005)
 Company (2002) - Anees  
 A Very Very Silent Film (2001)  
 Choo Lenge Akash (2001)  
 Monsoon Wedding (2001) - Yadav
 Aap Kaa Surroor (2007) - Ghulam Sayyed Auto Rickshaw Driver
 Ferrous (2019) - Matin Khan
 Mithila Makhaan - Brahma
 Blackboard v/s Whiteboard (2019)
 Gun Pe Done (2019)
 Setters (2019)
 Running Shaadi (2017)

References

Sources 
Indian Express: The Art Effect
The Times of India: Pankaj Jha at an arty do for charity

External links 
 

Male actors in Hindi television
Male actors from Patna
People from Bihar
Living people
Patna University alumni
Year of birth missing (living people)